Kalyani Priyadarshan (born 5 April 1993) is an Indian actress who primarily appears in Malayalam, Telugu and Tamil- language films. She began her film career as an assistant production designer, and made her acting debut in the Telugu film Hello (2017), for which she won the Filmfare Award for Best Female Debut – South and the SIIMA Award for Best Female Debut – Telugu.

Kalyani made her Malayalam film debut with Varane Avashyamund (2020), for which she won SIIMA Award for Best Female Debut – Malayalam. Kalyani has been part of successful films including the Telugu film Chitralahari (2019), Tamil film Maanaadu (2021), and the Malayalam films Hridayam, Bro Daddy and Thallumaala, all (2022).

Early life and education
Kalyani was born on 5 April 1993 in Chennai, in a Malayali family to Indian filmmaker Priyadarshan and actress Lissy. She is the elder of two children, with a brother Sidharth. She did her early schooling in Lady Andal, Chennai and later studied in Singapore, where she also worked in theatre groups.

After completing her schooling, she got her bachelor's degree in architecture designing from Parsons School of Design, New York City. During this time she also interned in theatre at the Williamstown Theatre Festival. Returning to India, she attended an acting workshop in Adishakti Theatre, Pondicherry.

Career

Debut and early work (2013-2020)
Kalyani began her film career in 2013 as an assistant production designer under Sabu Cyril in the Hindi film Krrish 3 (2013). In 2016 she worked as an assistant art director in the Tamil film Iru Mugan (2016). In the following year, she made her acting debut with the Telugu film Hello (2017), opposite Akhil Akkineni. The film released worldwide on 22 December 2017, and she had received positive response for her performance from critics. Her first release in Malayalam was Varane Avashyamund, directed by Anoop Sathyan.

Career progression (2021-present)
In 2021, she appeared in Tamil-language science fiction action thriller film Maanaadu alongside actor Silambarasan. Her next release in the same year was Malayalam film Marakkar: Arabikadalinte Simham. The film received mixed to negative reviews and failed at the box office. In 2022, she appeared in Hridayam, opposite Pranav Mohanlal. She next appeared in Bro Daddy directed by and starring Prithviraj Sukumaran, which released directly on Disney+ Hotstar, and also appeared in Thallumaala (2022) directed by Khalid Rahman, opposite Tovino Thomas.

Media image 

Kalyani received critical acclaim for her film debut Hello. She termed the film as "the best film" that has happened to her career.

Kalyani is a prominent celebrity endorser for several brands and products including Kalyan Jewellers and Ajio. She has been the cover model for various magazines including "Ritz" and "You & I".

Kalyani was named Kochi Times Most Desirable Women of 2020. The same year, she ranked 8th in Chennai Times Most Desirable Women and 41st in Times Most Desirable Women list.

Filmography

Films

Accolades

References

External links

 
 

Living people
Actresses in Telugu cinema
Actresses from Chennai
Malayali people
South Indian International Movie Awards winners
Filmfare Awards South winners
Actresses in Tamil cinema
Parsons School of Design alumni
1993 births